This Age Without Pity (French: Cet âge est sans pitié) is a 1952 French comedy film directed by Marcel Blistène and starring Colette Darfeuil, André Alerme and Jean Tissier.  It was shot using the Gevacolor process. It was filmed at the Victorine Studios in Nice and on location around Cannes and Tourrettes-sur-Loup on the French Riviera.

Synopsis
Four university acting students decided to take a camping holiday. There car breaks down near a village where a historical film is being shot by a celebrated director and featuring a famous sex symbol Barbara Glamour.

Cast
  Colette Darfeuil as Barbara Glamour, la star du film en tournage
 André Alerme as Boniface Médéric, le réalisateur du film
 Jean Tissier as Bigarreau, l'assistant-réalisateur
 José Noguero as Eduardo Tocata, le jeune premier
 Jean Vinci as André
 Jacques Famery as Léon,
 France Degand as Christiane
 Colette Deréal as Monique
 Paul Demange as l'opérateur

References

Bibliography
Bazin, André . Bazin on Global Cinema, 1948-1958. University of Texas Press, 2014.
 Rège, Philippe. Encyclopedia of French Film Directors, Volume 1. Scarecrow Press, 2009.

External links 
 

1952 films
1950s French-language films
1952 comedy films
French comedy films
Films directed by Marcel Blistène
Films about filmmaking
1950s French films
Films shot at Victorine Studios

fr:Cet âge est sans pitié